The women's doubles wheelchair tennis competition at the 2008 Summer Paralympics in Beijing was held from 10 September to 15 September at the Olympic Green Tennis Centre. The DecoTurf surface rendered the event a hardcourt competition. This was the only Paralympic tournament in either singles or doubles at which Esther Vergeer lost a match.

Medalists

Calendar

Seeds

Draw

Key 

 INV = bipartite invitation
 IP = ITF place
 ALT = alternate

 r = retired
 w/o = walkover

Finals

Top half

Bottom half

References 
 
 

Women's Doubles
Para